The Greater Egg Harbor Regional High School District is a regional public high school district in Atlantic County, New Jersey, United States. The district serves students in ninth through twelfth grades from the constituent municipalities of Egg Harbor City, Galloway Township, Hamilton Township and Mullica Township, together with the districts of the City of Port Republic and Washington Township (in Burlington County) who attend as part of sending/receiving relationships.

As of the 2020–21 school year, the district, comprised of three schools, had an enrollment of 3,082 students and 264.4 classroom teachers (on an FTE basis), for a student–teacher ratio of 11.7:1.

The district is classified by the New Jersey Department of Education as being in District Factor Group "CD", the sixth-highest of eight groupings. District Factor Groups organize districts statewide to allow comparison by common socioeconomic characteristics of the local districts. From lowest socioeconomic status to highest, the categories are A, B, CD, DE, FG, GH, I and J.

History
The district was established with the passage of a referendum in January 1957 by the five constituent municipalities of Egg Harbor City, Egg Harbor Township, Galloway Township, Hamilton Township and Mullica Township by a 5-1 margin that allocated $1.7 million (equivalent to $ million in ) for the construction of what would be come Oakcrest High School. Egg Harbor Regional High School opened in September 1960, with 150 students from Hamilton Township shifted out of Vineland High School. The school was renamed as Oakcrest High School for the start of the 1960-61 school year. The school name was chosen based on its site on the crest of a hill amid oak trees.

Absegami High School opened in September 1982, after the school had co-existed with Oakcrest in a single building.

In a referendum held on September 25, 2007, by a 3,176 - 1,719 margin, voters approved a plan to construct a third high school in the district, to be located in Egg Harbor City and constricted at a cost of $81.7 million. The new Cedar Creek High School was planned to alleviate overcrowding in the two existing schools and serve students from Egg Harbor City and Mullica Township. Construction began in Fall 2008 and opened to students in September 2010.

In 2009-2010, the district had 3,296 students, its peak enrollment. Enrollment decreased afterward due to a decline in casino jobs. Between 2009-2010 and 2014 its enrollment declined by almost 6%.

Awards and recognition
For the 2005-06 school year, the district was recognized with the "Best Practices Award" by the New Jersey Department of Education for its "A Proactive Approach to Guidance and Career Services" Career Education program at Oakcrest High School.

Schools 
Schools in the district (with 2020–21 enrollment data from the National Center for Education Statistics) are:
 Absegami High School (1,132 students), located in Galloway Township, serves students from Galloway Township.
 Cedar Creek High School (935 students) located in Egg Harbor City, serves students from Egg Harbor City, Mullica Township, Port Republic and Washington Township (in Burlington County).
 Oakcrest High School (937 students) located in Hamilton Township, serves students from Hamilton Township.

Administration
Core members of the districts' administration are:
James Reina, Superintendent
Thomas P. Grossi, Business Administrator / Board Secretary

Board of education
The district's board of education, comprised of nine members, sets policy and oversees the fiscal and educational operation of the district through its administration. As a Type II school district, the board's trustees are elected directly by voters to serve three-year terms of office on a staggered basis, with three seats up for election each year held (since 2012) as part of the November general election. The board appoints a superintendent to oversee the day-to-day operation of the district. Seats on the nine-member board are allocated based on the population of the constituent municipalities, with four seats assigned to Galloway Township, three to Hamilton Township and one each to Egg Harbor City and Mullica Township.

References

External links 

Greater Egg Harbor Regional High School District

School Data for the Greater Egg Harbor Regional High School District, National Center for Education Statistics

1957 establishments in New Jersey
School districts established in 1957
New Jersey District Factor Group CD
School districts in Atlantic County, New Jersey
School districts in Burlington County, New Jersey
Egg Harbor City, New Jersey
Galloway Township, New Jersey
Hamilton Township, Atlantic County, New Jersey
Mullica Township, New Jersey
Port Republic, New Jersey
Washington Township, Burlington County, New Jersey